JMT Records (an acronym of Jazz Music Today) was a German record label founded by Stefan Winter. It was based in Munich, Germany, specialized in contemporary jazz, and operated from 1985 until 1995.

History
JMT released debut albums by Steve Coleman, Greg Osby, Cassandra Wilson, Jean-Paul Bourelly, and Robin Eubanks and also released early albums by Gary Thomas helping to define the M-Base concept. The label also produced early recordings of musicians associated with the New York downtown scene including Mark Feldman, Mark Dresser, Hank Roberts, Tim Berne, Uri Caine and Joey Baron. Other jazz musicians who recorded for JMT included Bob Stewart, Anthony Cox, and Craig Harris. European musicians such as Django Bates, Marc Ducret, and Peter Herborn were also part of the label's portfolio.

One of the most successful releases on JMT was John McLaughlin's Live at the Royal Festival Hall with Trilok Gurtu and Kai Eckhardt which reached number 3 in the Billboard  Top Contemporary Jazz Albums chart. Drummer and composer Paul Motian released eleven albums between 1988 and 1995 on the JMT label including many with his trio featuring Joe Lovano and Bill Frisell.

In 1995, JMT was fully absorbed into PolyGram, which deleted most of the label's back catalogue. One of the label's artists, Tim Berne, stated that the majority of his work vanished.

In 1997 Stefan Winter established Winter & Winter Records and gradually re-released the JMT catalogue through this label.

Discography

See also
 List of record labels

References

External links
 Winter & Winter's JMT catalogue

German independent record labels
Jazz record labels
Mass media in Munich